KCGR (90.5 FM) is a non-commercial educational radio station licensed to serve Oran, Missouri, United States.  The station, established in 2008, is owned by Bott Radio Network, through licensee Community Broadcasting, Inc.  KCGR broadcasts a Christian radio format as an affiliate of the Bott Radio Network.

History
This station received its original construction permit from the Federal Communications Commission on February 19, 2008.  The new station was assigned the KCGR call sign by the FCC on March 14, 2008.  KCGR received its license to cover from the FCC on November 4, 2008.

Translators
KCGR programming is also carried on several broadcast translator stations to extend or improve the coverage area of the primary station.

References

External links

CGR
Radio stations established in 2008
Scott County, Missouri
Moody Radio affiliate stations
Bott Radio Network stations